Jace Whittaker (born July 16, 1995) is an American football cornerback for the Arizona Cardinals of the National Football League (NFL). He was signed by the Cardinals as an undrafted free agent in 2020 following his college football career at Arizona.

Professional career

Whittaker signed with the Arizona Cardinals as an undrafted free agent following the 2020 NFL Draft on April 27, 2020. He was waived during final roster cuts on September 5, 2020, and signed to the team's practice squad the next day. He was elevated to the active roster on October 3, November 7, November 14, and January 2, 2021, for the team's weeks 4, 9, 10, 12, and 17 games against the Carolina Panthers, Miami Dolphins, Buffalo Bills, New England Patriots, and Los Angeles Rams, and reverted to the practice squad after each game. He signed a reserve/future contract on January 5, 2021.

On August 31, 2021, Whittaker was waived by the Cardinals and re-signed to the practice squad the next day. He signed a reserve/future contract with the Cardinals on January 19, 2022.

On August 30, 2022, Whittaker was waived by the Cardinals and signed to the practice squad the next day. He was released on November 9. He was re-signed to the active roster on December 14.

References

External links
Arizona Cardinals bio
Arizona Wildcats football bio

1995 births
Living people
Sportspeople from Oceanside, California
Players of American football from California
American football cornerbacks
Arizona Wildcats football players
Arizona Cardinals players